The Galena Police Department (GPD) is the municipal police department of the City of Galena in Alaska, located in the interior region of the state on the north banks of the Yukon River. Galena is located roughly midway between Nome and Fairbanks.

Overview 
The department is allocated a full-time sworn Chief of Police and a full-time, sworn officer. The department has an officer either on-duty or on-call 24 hours a day, every day of the year. If no officer is available, Alaska Troopers handle emergency calls until one returns. The department is also allocated one paid, seasonal reserve officer and one paid, seasonal civilian administrative assistant. The Chief is also authorized to appoint a number of non-salaried, volunteer auxiliary police officers. 

The agency provides police protection to all of the City of Galena and the road system in and around the City, which is located off the state's continuous road and ferry system. The city is accessible only by air year-round and by tugboat & cargo barge on the Yukon River in ice-free months (May-Sept.). The department also provides police protection to the Louden Tribal Community and to the Galena Interior Learning Academy (GILA), a public boarding high school located on the site of the former Galena Air Force Base. The City has 670 permanent residents, close to 130 GILA high school students during the school year (mid-Aug. to mid-May), along with close to 15 seasonal school employees. The GILA students who come from all over Alaska are not included in the student population of approximately 90 city school students who reside in Galena year-round and attend the Sidney C. Huntington K-12 Public School. The US Bureau of Land management also has close to 30 seasonal summer employees during the summer fire season (mid-May to early Sept.). 

The State of Alaska also operates a summer vocational training camp at the GILA Campus each summer; two 2-week sessions for approximately 10-15 adult students. The Galena Air Force Base was activated as an Army Air Corps Base in World War 2, where lend-lease aircraft were staged while en route to Russia. The Base became an Air Force Base in 1947 and played a prominent Cold War role defending the Alaskan frontier as the US Air Force fighter intercept base closest to Russia. The base was deactivated in 1993 and completely closed as of Oct. 1st, 2008, by the Base Realignment Committee (BRAC). Galena Police are assisted by an Alaska State Trooper post also located on the base site, which is manned by two law enforcement "blue shirt" troopers and one wildlife "brown shirt" trooper-pilot. Galena Police can also receive assisted in emergencies from the two federal law enforcement officers of the US Fish and Wildlife Service who are assigned to the Galena Office; a split-duty law enforcement officer who also manages the Galena Office and a full-time law enforcement officer-pilot, who is also dual-commissioned as a Special Alaska State Trooper and can thus enforce state laws while serving the surrounding US Wildlife Preserve lands. The former Galena Air Base air field is now the Edward Pitka Airport and is one of the more heavily used interior Alaskan "bush" airports. 

The police department, which has a holding cell for temporary prisoner housing, is manned by civilian jail guards when needed. The police station is located at the City Hall complex on Antoski Road in Galena and has been operational for over a decade. The department utilizes the old Air Force weapons firing range for weapons training and has a satellite office at the GILA Campus. Persons arrested by Galena Police are arraigned and tried at the Galena courthouse. Adult prisoners who are remanded are transported by either commercial air or Alaska Trooper aircraft to the Alaska Department of Correction facility, Fairbanks Correctional Center (FCC), while juveniles are transported to the Fairbanks Youth Facility (FYF), both located in Fairbanks. 

The department has two 4-wheel drive patrol vehicles and maintains communications by phone-link radios, both hand-held and vehicle-mounted. Officers receive dispatch support from the Alaska State Troopers "D" Detachment in Fairbanks. State Troopers also can provide tactical support if needed, with a regional SWAT Team from "D" Detachment and investigative support is available from the Trooper's investigative arm, the Alaska Bureau of Investigation (ABI). The department currently has an internal hostage negotiator and its own training officer. Galena police officers are issued Glock Model 22 .40 caliber pistols and .12 gauge shotguns. Officers are cross-trained as Alaskan Emergency Trauma Technicians (ETT) or Alaska Emergency Medical Technicians (EMT) and they routinely assist the Galena volunteer Emergency Medical Service (EMS). The department has a distinctive and colorful uniform shoulder patch depicting the Yukon River, Alaskan wildlife and the midnight sun of the northern summers. The badge is also a distinctive 7-point star with a grizzly bear in the center. 

Galena police officers are trained at the Alaska Public Safety Academy in Sitka or at the University of Alaska-Fairbanks Police Academy. Police Chief Michael Ervin assumed the post in OCT of 2009 and  resigned in the summer of 2010, after succeeding chief is John Millan, a retired North Carolina chief who succeeded Chief Lowell Carlton, a retired California law enforcement officer, who retired in 2007.

See also 

 List of law enforcement agencies in Alaska

References

External links
 City of Galena website
 Galena Police website

Municipal police departments of Alaska